The Libyan relegation play-off was contested between the three second-placed teams in the 3 groups in the 2007–08 Libyan Second Division: Wefaq Sabratha (Group A), Al Mustaqbal (Group B), and Al Sawa'ed (Group C) and the 13th placed team in the 2007–08 Libyan Premier League, which was Al Tahaddy. The four sides played each other once at neutral venues. The side that finished top would be promoted to the LPL, while if Al Tahaddy finished top, they would retain their place in the top flight.

The play-off was contested from July 28, 2008 to August 6, 2008. Wefaq Sabratha won the play-off on goal difference from Al Sawa'ed, therefore gaining promotion to the 2008–09 Libyan Premier League, and so Al Tahaddy were relegated.

Table

Match details

Round 1

All Times EET

Round 2

Round 3

2007–08 in Libyan football